SIEC may refer to:

Symbiosis International Education Centre, now Symbiosis International University
SIEC (The Integrated National System for Criminal Statistics), see Domestic violence in Panama
Sydney International Equestrian Centre, known as SIEC
Sexuality Information and Education Council of the United States, known as SIECUS